Actinium(III) iodide is the a salt of the radioactive metal actinium. It is a white crystalline solid. This compound was made by heating actinium oxide with a mixture of aluminum metal and iodine at 700°C for two hours.

References

Actinium compounds
Iodides